Jeon Won-Keun  (born 13 November 1986) is a South Korean football player.

Club career

Gangwon FC called upon Jeon as their first pick in the 2009 K-League Draft. He quickly established himself in the first team, playing in all but two of Gangwon's league matches in 2009.  At the end of the 2009 playing season, on 30 November 2009, he moved to Daegu FC. He saw little on field action during the 2010 season, making only three appearances with the senior squad. On 2 August 2011, he moved to K-League rivals Gyeongnam FC.

Club career statistics

References

External links

1986 births
Living people
South Korean footballers
Gangwon FC players
Daegu FC players
Gyeongnam FC players
Ulsan Hyundai Mipo Dockyard FC players
K League 1 players
Korea National League players
Korea University alumni
Association football defenders